Thibaut Dapréla (born 2 February 2001) is a French downhill mountain biker. He finished second overall in the 2021 UCI Downhill World Cup and won the round in Les Gets.

Major results

2018
 1st Overall UCI Junior Downhill World Cup
1st Lošinj
1st Vallnord
1st Val di Sole
1st Mont-Sainte-Anne
1st La Bresse
2nd Fort William
2nd Leogang
2019
 1st Overall UCI Junior Downhill World Cup
1st Maribor
1st Fort William
1st Leogang
1st Les Gets
1st Snowshoe
 1st  National DH Championships
2021
 2nd Overall UCI Downhill World Cup
1st Les Gets
2nd Leogang
3rd Lenzerheide

References

Living people
Downhill mountain bikers
2001 births
French male cyclists
French mountain bikers